Mohammad Moinuddin Abdullah is a Bangladeshi civil servant and chairman of the Anti-Corruption Commission. During his term Anti-Corruption Commission officials raised complaints against the top management of the commission coming from Bangladesh Civil Service and operating under different rules from regular staff of the commission.

Early life 
Abdullah was born in 1959 in Comilla District, East Pakistan, Pakistan. He completed his undergraduate and masters in soil sciences from the University of Dhaka.

Career 
Abdullah joined the Bangladesh Civil Service in 1983 as an administration cadre. He first posting was as magistrate.

Abdullah had served as the assistant private secretary to the Chief Adviser of the caretaker government of Bangladesh, Fakhruddin Ahmed.

In May 2009, Abdullah was appointed director general of the Prime Minister's Office under Prime Minister Sheikh Hasina and served there till May 2010. Abdullah served as the divisional commissioner of Dhaka Division from 2010 to 2012. He was then appointed the Secretary at the Ministry of Industries.

From 2014 to 2016, Abdullah was the secretary at the Ministry of Housing and Public Works.

From 2016 to 2018, Abdullah served as the senior secretary of the Ministry of Agriculture.

In July 2019, Abdullah was made the chairperson of Palli Karma Sahayak Foundation. He served in the Syndicate Board of Dhaka University of Engineering and Technology, Jahangirnagar University, and Jatiya Kabi Kazi Nazrul Islam University. He is a former general secretary of the Bangladesh Administrative Service Association.

Abdullah was appointed the chairperson of the Bangladesh Anti Commission on 3 March 2021. He replaced Iqbal Mahmood as chairman.

References 

Living people
University of Dhaka alumni
Bangladeshi civil servants
People from Comilla District
1959 births